The Howick Island is the southernmost and a now uninhabited island in the Howick group that is part of the Great Barrier Reef Marine Park in Far North Queensland, Australia.

It fell within the territory of the Ithu people in pre-colonial times.

Etymology
The island group was named by Lieutenant Charles Jeffreys RN, captain of HMS Kangaroo, in 1815, possibly after Sir Charles Grey, Viscount Howick, a soldier.

Ion Idriess' first novel, Madman's Island, was published in 1927 and is semi-autobiographical based on the author's experiences on Howick Island.

See also

Protected areas of Queensland
List of islands of Queensland

References

Islands on the Great Barrier Reef
Uninhabited islands of Australia
Islands of Far North Queensland
Coral Sea Islands
Places in the Great Barrier Reef Marine Park